Piotr Banasiak, nicknamed Banan, is a Polish retired association football player who played as a goalkeeper.

Having been born and raised in Radom, he is one of the few players to have spent an entire career at only one club, his hometown Radomiak Radom, making him a club legend.

He retired in 2017, and stated that his intention to join the traditional workforce.

His brother Michał was also a former goalkeeper, although only semi-professional and amateur levels.

References

1987 births
People from Radom
Polish footballers
Radomiak Radom players
Association football goalkeepers
Living people